Josef Gusten Algot Svennung (17 January 1895 - 11 March 1985) was a Swedish classical philologist. He was Professor of Latin Language and Literature at Uppsala University from 1944 to 1961. Svennung is particularly known for his research on what Jordanes and other classical writers wrote about Scandza and the rest of Northern Europe.

Selected works
 Orosiana. Syntaktische, semasiologische und kritische Studien zu Orosius, 1922
 Palladii Rutilii Tauri Aemiliani viri illustris Opus agriculturae. Liber quartus decimus de veterinaria medicina, 1926
 Om Palladius' De medicina pecorum, 1929
 Wortstudien zu den spätlateinischen Oribasiusrezensionen, 1932
 Untersuchungen zu Palladius und zur lateinischen Fach- und Volkssprache, 1935
 Kleine Beiträge zur lateinischen Lautlehre, 1936
 Compositiones Lucenses. Studien zum Inhalt, zur Textkritik und Sprache, 1941
 Catulls Bildersprache, 1945
 "Vitala stad" och det forna Vetlanda, 1947
 Belt und Baltisch. Ostseeische Namenstudien. Mit besonderer Rücksicht auf Adam von Bremen, 1953
 Den värendska arvsrätten, 1956
 Anredeformen. Vergleichende Forschungen zur indirekten Anrede in der 3. Person und zum Nominativ für den Vokativ, 1958
 Svearnas ö och sithonerna hos Tacitus, 1962
 Från senantik och medeltid: latinska texter av kulturhistoriskt intresse, 1963
 Scandinavia und Scandia: lateinisch-nordische Namenstudien, 1963
 Jordanes und Scandia, 1967
 Zur Geschichte des Goticismus, 1967
 Skandinavien bei Plinius und Ptolemaios : kritisch-exegetische Forschungen zu den ältesten nordischen Sprachdenkmälern, 1974

References
 Dag Norberg: "Josef Svennung". I Kungl. Vitterhets historie och antikvitetsakademiens årsbok, 1985, s. 52-53
 Sten Carlsson: "Minnesord: den 6 november 1985". I Saga och sed, 1986, s. [9]-20
 Alf Önnerfors: "Gudmund Björck (1905-1955) und Josef Svennung (1895-1985)" (Alma mater studiorum, 1993), s. 132-135

1895 births
1985 deaths
Swedish classical scholars
Swedish philologists
Academic staff of Uppsala University
20th-century philologists
Members of the Royal Gustavus Adolphus Academy